Jassi – Back with a Bang is the ninth studio album by Punjabi singer Jasbir Jassi, released on 16 July 2010 worldwide. Some songs on the Album ("Bang", "Kalaria", "Mela", "Baliye") were co-produced by multiple Grammy winning record producer Jeff Bhasker.

Track listing

References

2010 albums
Jasbir Jassi albums